Hasanabad-e Amelzadeh (also Romanized as Ḩasanābād-e ʿĀmelzādeh) is a village in Bizaki Rural District, Golbajar District, Chenaran County, Razavi Khorasan Province, Iran.

Census
At the 2006 census, its population was 127, in 37 families.

References 

Populated places in Chenaran County